is a visual novel made by NekoNeko Soft released in 2001. It has versions for four different platforms: Windows CD (3 Disc), Dreamcast, PlayStation 2, and Windows DVD-Rom.

There were two anime OVA adaptations of the game, a two-episode hentai OVA in 2002, and Mizuiro 2003, a two-episode non-hentai OVA in 2003. Both have same characters, but with somewhat different storylines.

Characters
 
 The protagonist controlled by the player.
 
 The heroine of the story. Kenji Katase's adopted little sister.
 
 Kenji Katase's childhood friend. (In DC/PS2 version she has two different stories)
 
 Kenji Katase's childhood friend.

 Yuki's trusted friend. In her story, she is shy. In all other stories, she is very loud and humorous.
 
 A shy, but smart third year student.

 Kenji Katase's tutor. She is quite strict. (DC/PS2 version only)

Game Setting
 Prologue: The player's character is very young, with the story beginning with the meeting of Yuki for the first time and developing a loving sibling relationship although they are not both related in blood as Yuki was adopted.
 Pre-Opening: The player makes choices to decide the story of the game, with the players character still very young. The first meeting of Hiyori occurs, who is a lost girl crying in the park. The game then presents the problems of the character that your choices led to.
 Game: The players character is in the second year of senior high in the game (grade 11). A story about a character is presented to the player depending on the choices made in the last setting. Each story has a moving or tragic situation.
 Voice: Most of the female characters you encounter have a very calm voice, though it depends on the situation.

See also
 Bishōjo game
 List of television shows based on video games

References

External links
 NekoNeko soft 
 Mizuiro game info 
 Unofficial English translation for Mizuiro
 
 

2001 video games
2002 anime OVAs
Bishōjo games
Dreamcast games
Eroge
Hentai anime and manga
Japan-exclusive video games
Pink Pineapple
PlayStation 2 games
Video games developed in Japan
Visual novels
Windows games